The history of Alicante spans thousands of years. The first settlements in the Alicante area were made by Iberian tribes. Since then the area has been inhabited successively by Greeks, Romans, Muslims, and Christians.

Before the 20th Century

The area around Alicante has been inhabited for over 7000 years, with the first tribes of hunter gatherers moving down gradually from Central Europe between 5000 and 3000 BC. Some of the earliest settlements were made on the slopes of Mount Benacantil, where the Castillo de Santa Barbara stands today. By 1000 BC Greek and Phoenician traders had begun to visit the eastern coast of Spain, establishing small trading ports and introducing the native Iberian tribes to the alphabet, iron and the pottery wheel.

By the 6th century, the rival armies of Carthage and Rome began to invade and fight for control of the Iberian Peninsula. The Carthaginian general Hamilcar Barca established the fortified settlement of Akra Leuka (Greek: , meaning "White Mountain" or "White Point"), where Alicante stands today.

Although the Carthaginians conquered much of the land around Alicante, they were in the end no match for the Romans, who established rule in the province for over 700 years. By the 5th century Rome was in decline, and the Roman predecessor of Alicante, known as Lucentum, "Place of Light" in (Latin), was more or less under the control of the Visigothic warlord Theudimer. Neither the Romans nor the Goths, however, put up much resistance to the Arab conquest of the Medina al-Laqant in the 8th century, which brought oranges, rice, palms and the gifts of Moorish art and architecture to the city, which the Muslims called  
al-Akant, also meaning "Place of Light".

The Moors ruled southern and eastern Spain until the 11th century reconquista (reconquest). Alicante was finally taken in 1246 by the Castilian king Alfonso X, but it passed soon and definitely to the Kingdom of Valencia in 1298 with the Catalan King James II of Aragon. It gained the status of Royal Village (Vila Reial) with representation in the medieval Valencian Parliament.

After several decades of a battle field between the Kingdom of Castile and the Crown of Aragon, Alicante enjoyed a segle d'or (golden age) during the 15th century together with the whole Kingdom of Valencia, rising to become a major Mediterranean trading station exporting rice, wine, olive oil, oranges and wool. Between 1609 and 1614 King Felipe III expelled thousands of moriscos who had remained in Valencia after the reconquista, due to their allegiance with Berber pirates who continually attacked coastal cities and caused much harm to trade. This act cost the region dearly - with so many skilled artisans and agricultural labourers gone, the feudal nobility found itself sliding into bankruptcy.

In the early 18th century Alicante, along with the rest of Valencia, backed Carlos in the War of Spanish Succession. Felipe won, and he punished the whole region by withdrawing the semi-autonomous status it had enjoyed since the time of the reconquista. Alicante went into a long, slow decline, surviving through the 18th and 19th centuries by making shoes and agricultural products such as oranges and almonds, and its fisheries. The end of the 19th century witnessed a sharp recovery of the local economy with increasing international trade and the growth of the city harbour leading to increased exports of several products (particularly during World War I when Spain was a neutral country).

Modern history

During the early 20th century, Alicante was a minor capital which enjoyed the benefit of Spain's neutrality during the First World War, which provided new opportunities for the local industry and agriculture. The Moroccan war of the 1920s saw numerous alicantinos drafted to fight in the long and bloody campaigns at the former Spanish protectorate (Northern Morocco) against the Rif rebels. The political unrest of the late 1920s led to the victory of republican candidates in the local council elections throughout the country, and the abdication of King Alfonso XIII.

The proclamation of the Second Spanish Republic was much celebrated in the city on April 14, 1931. The Spanish Civil War broke out on July 17, 1936. Alicante was the last city loyal to the Republican government to be occupied by General Franco's troops on April 1, 1939, and its harbour saw the last Republican government officials flee the country. Even if not as famous as the bombing of Guernica by the German Luftwaffe, Alicante was the target of some vicious air bombings during the three years of civil conflict, most remarkably the bombing by the Italian Aviazione Legionaria of the Mercado de Abastos on May 25, 1938 in which more than 300 civilians perished.

The next 20 years under Franco's dictatorship were difficult for Alicante as it was for the entire country. However, the late 1950s and early 1960s saw the onset of a lasting transformation of the city due to tourism. Large buildings and complexes rose in nearby Albufereta (e.g. El Barco) and Playa de San Juan, with the benign climate being the best tool to bring prospective buyers and tourists who kept hotels reasonably busy.

The tourist development, aside from construction, also brought numerous businesses such as restaurants, bars and other businesses focused on visitors. The old airfield at Rabasa was closed and air traffic moved to the new El Altet Airport, which made for a convenient facility for charter flights bringing tourists from northern European countries.

When Franco died in 1975, his successor Juan Carlos I successfully oversaw the transition of Spain to a democratic constitutional monarchy. Governments of nationalities and regions were given more autonomy, and the Valencia region was permitted an autonomy they had not been allowed for four centuries.

Later notable landmarks have been the opening of the European Union Office for Harmonization in the Internal Market and the construction of the Ciudad de la Luz, a series of facilities meant to sponsor film industries in setting up operations at Alicante.

See also
 Timeline of Alicante

References

Bibliography

Alicante
Alicante